is a former Japanese football player. He played for Japan national team.

Club career
Tani was born in Aichi Prefecture on November 13, 1968. After graduating from University of Tsukuba, he joined Hitachi (later Kashiwa Reysol) in 1991. The club won the 2nd place in 1992 and 1994 Japan Football League. The club was promoted to J1 League from 1995. He retired end of 1995 season.

National team career
On July 27, 1990, Tani debuted for Japan national team against South Korea.

Club statistics

National team statistics

References

External links

Japan National Football Team Database

1968 births
Living people
University of Tsukuba alumni
Association football people from Aichi Prefecture
Japanese footballers
Japan international footballers
Japan Soccer League players
J1 League players
Japan Football League (1992–1998) players
Kashiwa Reysol players
Association football forwards